Waterloo Day is 18 June, the date of the Battle of Waterloo, in 1815.  It is remembered and celebrated each year by certain regiments of the British Army, in the same way that the Royal Navy celebrates Trafalgar Day (21 October).

References 

Victory days
June observances
Public holidays in the United Kingdom
British Army
Annual events in the United Kingdom
Battle of Waterloo